The 1912 United States presidential election in Georgia took place on November 5, 1912, as part of the 1912 United States presidential election. Georgia voters chose 14 representatives, or electors, to the Electoral College, who voted for president and vice president.

Background and vote
With the exception of a handful of historically Unionist North Georgia counties – chiefly Fannin but also to a lesser extent Pickens, Gilmer and Towns – Georgia since the 1880s had been a one-party state dominated by the Democratic Party. Disfranchisement of almost all African-Americans and most poor whites had made the Republican Party virtually nonexistent outside of local governments in those few hill counties, and the national Democratic Party served as the guardian of white supremacy against a Republican Party historically associated with memories of Reconstruction. The only competitive elections were Democratic primaries, which state laws restricted to whites on the grounds of the Democratic Party being legally a private club.

In 1908 the Republican Party had made some gains in the South due to opposition by developing manufacturers to William Jennings Bryan’s populism, and by nominee William Howard Taft’s willingness to accept black disfranchisement. This resulted in the GOP carrying twelve secessionist upcountry counties that had never gone Republican before. The split in the GOP after the 1908 election prevented any maintenance of these gains – which had seen Bryan’s 1908 performance as the poorest by a Democrat in Georgia until pro-civil rights Lyndon B. Johnson lost the state in 1964 – but Roosevelt did hold on to some of the new Republican vote from 1908, consequently finishing far ahead of regular Republican and incumbent President Taft.

Georgia was won by the Princeton University President Woodrow Wilson (D–Virginia), running with governor of Indiana Thomas R. Marshall, with 76.63 percent of the popular vote against the 26th president of the United States Theodore Roosevelt (P–New York), running with governor of California Hiram Johnson, with 18.10% of the popular vote.

Results

Results by county

Notes

References

Georgia
1912
1912 Georgia (U.S. state) elections